Bryan Yeubrey (born 18 August 1960) is a PR consultant and agent for sportspeople, musicians and writers.

Career 
As a FIFA licensed players' agent, he has represented international footballers including Essam El-Hadary and Hossam Ghaly. He is also the agent of the "spiderman" climber Alain Robert.

Other interests 
In 1987, Yeubrey and musician Robin George of the band Magnum invented the onboard 'compact tuner', which allowed stringed instruments to include built-in frequency counting tuning device (Patent EP0269652). The Yeubrey/George form of tuning is now a worldwide standard.

Yeubrey is also leading a campaign to honour the former England captain Billy Wright CBE, with a posthumous knighthood.

References 

1960 births
Living people
Public relations people